Rosanelda Geraldina López "Rossy" Aguirre (born April 2, 1968, in Mexico City) is a Mexican actress and director. Aguirre began voice work (dubbing) at the age of 5, following the career of her mother, Rosanelda, who was also an actress.  Her specialities are young women (ranging from tomboys to gentle ladies, but leaning more towards the first archetype) and young boys under the age of 16.

Filmography

Animation 
 Amy Mizuno aka Sailor Mercury in Sailor Moon
 Akane Tendo in the Ranma ½ TV series
 Buttercup in The Powerpuff Girls (1998)
 Child and teenaged Krillin in Dragon Ball and Dragon Ball Z (up until the first half of the Freezer saga)
 Kiyoko in Akira (Spanish-language version)
 Samuel "Sammy" Oak in Pokémon 4
 Murasaki Suminawa in The Plot of the Fuma Clan
 Gosalyn Waddlemeyer-Mallard in Darkwing Duck
 Princess Aphros in Cyborg 009 (Spanish-language version)
 Meena of the X-Laws in Shaman King
 D.W. in Arthur (TV series)
 Phil in Rugrats and Rugrats Crecidos
 Patty in Peanuts
 Phoebe in Hey Arnold!
 Ayumi in Inuyasha (Spanish-language version)
 Cherry (Cereza) in the Saber Marionette (Chica Marionetta) series (Spanish-language version)
 Euridice in Saint Seiya: Hades Inferno (DVD Dub)
 Nagisa Kano in Fight! Iczer-One
 Pom in Babar: The Movie and Babar (TV series) (Mexican re-dubs)
 Clara in The Nutcracker Prince
 Sleeping Beauty in Shrek the Third (Latin American Spanish-language version) 
 Lola Mbola in Robotboy
 Additional voices in Adventures of Sonic the Hedgehog
 Additional voices in Sonic Underground
 Mavis and Rusty in Thomas and Friends
 Nicole Watterson (Gumball's Mom) in The Amazing World of Gumball (Latin American Spanish-language version)
 Patti Mayonnaise in Doug (Disney episodes)
Slouchy Smurfling (11 year old) The Smurfs (5th season- 8th season)
 Arrietty in The Secret World of Arrietty (DVD Dub)

Live-action 
 Perla (voiceover for Elisa Erali) in La Letra Escarlata (her debut)
 Toby Hart (voiceover for Adam Rich) in El Diablo y Max Devlin
 Whit Stovall (voiceover for Kyle Eastwood) in Honkytonk Man
 Lt. Saavik (voiceover for Kirstie Alley) in Viaje a las Estrellas: La Ira de Khan
 Lt. Saavik (voiceover for Robin Curtis) in Viaje a las Estrellas III: La Búsqueda de Spock
 Susan (voiceover for Madonna) in Desperately Seeking Susan
 David Freeman (voiceover for Joey Cramer) in El Vuelo del Navegador
 Gordie Lachance (voiceover for Wil Wheaton) in Cuenta Conmigo
 Lt. Saavik (voiceover for Robin Curtis) in Viaje a las Estrellas IV: El Viaje a Casa
 Wesley Crusher (voiceover for Wil Wheaton) in Viaje a Las Estrellas: La Nueva Generación
 John Connor (voiceover for Eddie Furlong) in Terminator 2: El Juicio Final
 Mae Mordabito (voiceover for Madonna) in A League of Their Own
 Valerie Solanas (voiceover for Lili Taylor) in Yo le Disparé  Andy Warhol
 Julieta (voiceover for Claire Danes) in William Shakespeare's Romeo y Julieta
 Joey Potter (voiceover for Katie Holmes) in Dawson's Creek
 Alan A. Allen (voiceover for Rupert Grint) in Thunderpants
 Wesley Crusher (voiceover for Wil Wheaton) in Viaje a las Estrellas: Nemesis.

References

1968 births
Living people
20th-century Mexican actresses
21st-century Mexican actresses
Actresses from Mexico City
Mexican actresses
Mexican voice actresses
Mexican voice directors
Mexican people of Basque descent